ABN or Assholes by Nature is an American hip hop duo, composed of Houston, Texas-based rappers Trae tha Truth and Z-Ro. They have so far released two studio albums Assholes by Nature (2003) and It Is What It Is (2008).

History
The duo is a collaboration between Z-Ro and Trae, both of whom are well established solo recording artists within Texas' underground hip hop scene. Their first collaboration was on Z-Ro's debut album Look What You Did to Me (1998), with them regularly appearing on each other's albums thereafter. Z-Ro and Trae grew apart in subsequent years and parted ways altogether after their last (and so far final) album in 2008 due to personal and creative differences.

Discography
ABN's first release was a double CD titled Assholes by Nature. It was released in 2003 by the independent label G-Maab Records and was produced by P.K. Johnson.

In 2008 the duo released It Is What It Is which turned out to be the biggest commercial success for both artists.  The album was released on Rap-A-Lot Records and produced by Brandon Crear. The album reached number 62 on the Billboard 200, 10 on the Top R&B/Hip-Hop Albums, and 7 on the Top Rap Albums charts. Previously the artists had 13 appearances on the Top R&B/Hip-Hop Albums chart between them; this was the first in the top 10.

Studio albums

References

External links
 
 

African-American musical groups
American musical duos
Musical groups established in 2003
Musical groups from Texas
Southern hip hop groups
Hip hop duos
Family musical groups
Gangsta rap groups
2003 establishments in Texas